The 1936–37 Georgetown Hoyas men's basketball team represented Georgetown University during the 1936–37 NCAA college basketball season. Fred Mesmer coached it in his sixth season as head coach. The team was a member of the Eastern Intercollegiate Conference (EIC) and played its home games at Tech Gymnasium on the campus of McKinley Technical High School in Washington, D.C. The team finished with a record of 9-8 overall, 3-7 in the EIC.

Season recap

Sophomore guard Ed Kurtyka and sophomore forward Joe Murphy joined the team this season. Georgetown made its first-ever visit to Madison Square Garden to play New York University in the third game of the season, and Murphy scored 11 points in the first of 17 games in which he would score in double figures during his 65-game collegiate career. Kurtyka led the team in scoring for the season, while Murphy averaged 4.9 points per game and finished the year second-highest in scoring behind Kurtyka.

Junior forward Harry Bassin saw less playing time than he had the previous season and averaged a career-low 4.0 points per game, but he nonetheless was an important force in games and scored a season-high 12 points against Syracuse in a Georgetown victory that ended a multi-year Syracuse home winning streak. Junior forward and team captain Mike Petrosky averaged a career-low 4.3 points per game for the season, but put in a strong defensive and rebounding performance.

Despite playing only six home games all season, the 1936-37 Hoyas finished with a record of 9-8, only the second winning season for Georgetown in the last seven. In non-conference games they had gone 6-1, but they had struggled in EIC games, finishing with a conference record of 3-7. The 1936-37 squad was the second and last of Mesmers teams to finish with an overall winning record.

Roster
Sources

Junior guard Tom Nolan would go on to serve as Georgetowns head basketball coach from 1956 to 1960, and as the schools baseball coach until the end of the 1978 season.

1936–37 schedule and results
Sources

|-
!colspan=9 style="background:#002147; color:#8D817B;"| Regular Season

References

Georgetown Hoyas men's basketball seasons
Georgetown Hoyas
Georgetown Hoyas men's basketball team
Georgetown Hoyas men's basketball team